Madhya Pradesh Premier League is the top-tier state league in the Indian state of Madhya Pradesh. It is organised by Madhya Pradesh Football Association (MPFA).

The inaugural season kicked off on 10 January 2021, with 8 teams competing for the maiden title. On 27 January 2021, Madan Maharaj FC became the  champions of the inaugural edition by defeating Lion's Club 2–0 in the final.

Format and regulations
A total of 8 teams are competing in the league 2022-23. Each team can sign any number of players outside the state of Madhya Pradesh, however at least 5 in the playing 11 must be from the district the club belongs. A maximum of 2 foreign players are allowed per squad. Each team plays home and away round robin format with every other team and first two will play the final match to decide the Champion at the end of league.

Teams
Currently a total of 8 clubs participate in 3rd Madhya Pradesh Premier league.

Winners

Media coverage

See also
Madhya Pradesh Football Association

References

Football in Madhya Pradesh
Football leagues in India
2021 establishments in Madhya Pradesh
Sports leagues established in 2021